Brief Encounter is an opera in two acts by composer André Previn. The English libretto by John Caird is based on Noël Coward's play Still Life and Coward's screenplay for the 1945 David Lean film Brief Encounter. Commissioned by the Houston Grand Opera, the opera premiered on May 1, 2009 in Houston, Texas at the Wortham Theater Center. 

The production starred Elizabeth Futral as Laura Jesson and Nathan Gunn as Alec Harvey, with Rebekah Camm, Meredith Arwady, Robert Orth, and Kim Josephson as supporting soloists and Patrick Summers conducting. A recording was issued on the Deutsche Grammophon label.

Further reading
 Frédéric Döhl: About the Task of Adapting a Movie Classic for the Opera Stage: On André Previn’s A Streetcar Named Desire (1998) and Brief Encounter (2009). In: Frédéric Döhl & Gregor Herzfeld (edits.): In Search of the Great American Opera: Tendenzen des amerikanischen Musiktheaters, Münster 2016, p. 147–175.
 Frédéric Döhl: Brief Encounter: Zu David Leans Film (1945) and André Previns Oper (2009). In Archiv für Musikwissenschaft 70/4 (2013), .

References

External links
Brief Encounter at houstongrandopera.org

2009 operas
English-language operas
Operas by André Previn
Operas
Opera world premieres at Houston Grand Opera
Operas based on films
Operas set in England
Operas set in London